is a Japanese manga series written and illustrated by Kōji Kumeta. It was serialized in Kodansha's Weekly Shōnen Magazine from April 2005 to June 2012, with its chapters collected in 30 tankōbon volumes. The series follows Nozomu Itoshiki, a teacher who takes all aspects of life, word, and culture in the most negative light possible. The series satirizes politics, media, and Japanese society.

The manga was adapted into three anime television series and two sets of original video animations (OVAs) animated by Shaft between 2007 and 2010.

As of April 2011, the manga had over 5 million copies in circulation. In 2007, Sayonara, Zetsubou-Sensei received the 31st Kodansha Manga Award for the shōnen category.

Plot and setting

Sayonara, Zetsubou-Sensei revolves around a very pessimistic high school teacher named Nozomu Itoshiki who, at the very beginning of the series, tries to hang himself on a sakura tree. He is saved by an extremely optimistic student known only as Kafuka Fuura (though in her effort to save his life, she almost kills him). She explains to him that it is simply unimaginable that he would hang himself on such a nice day, especially in front of such beautiful trees. She decides to nickname Nozomu , and offers to pay him fifty yen to call him by that nickname. After having enough of the strange Kafuka, Nozomu bolts to the school and starts his homeroom class, but the attempt to escape was in vain as he finds that she is one of his students. Not only that, but Kafuka is just the tip of the iceberg, due to each and every student in his class representing a new personality quirk or bizarre obsession, posing challenges that he must overcome in spite of himself.

Each chapter or episode of the series revolves around a particular aspect of life, Japanese culture, or a common phrase in the Japanese language. Typically, this involves the subject being taken either to its most logical extreme (a discussion of amakudari, the practice of "descending" from the public to the private sector, results in Nozomu "descending" until he reaches his previous life), or taken literally (in Nozomu's family, omiai, normally a meeting between a potential match in an arranged marriage, is instead a marriage made official by eye-contact). On other occasions, Nozomu challenges his students to think about the negative aspects of something usually considered positive. These in-depth, off-kilter analyses (along with the reactions of the students according to their own personality quirks) are usually brought to a head with a punchline based on the overall premise, or more rarely, a non-sequitur gag or piece of fan service.

While ostensibly set in the present day relative to its original serialization, the manga uses a variety of aesthetic tropes that evoke the Taishō period, the relatively liberal period in Japan before the rise of militarism in the Shōwa period. Many aesthetic aspects are meant to evoke Taishō liberalism, Taishō Romanticism (see Japanese literature) and Taishō arts (see Hanshinkan Modernism). This is exemplified by Nozomu and Matoi consistently wearing a kimono and hakama (an obsolete style of Japanese school uniforms in the late 1800s), but is also evident in stylistic choices such as the anachronistic appearance of architecture, vehicles, and technology indicative of the Taishō period. However, the fashion of women typically follows the modern girl trend, which is a break from the Meiji period and signifies the style of the Taishō period.

Chapter titles are oblique references to literature, modified to suit the needs of the chapter. The chapter title pages are drawn to resemble karuta cards, with an illustration in a silhouetted kiri-e style. The anime carries this further through a washed-out, grainy visual style that mimics film, and frequent use of katakana (rather than hiragana) as okurigana. The anime also regularly refers to the date as though Emperor Hirohito were still alive, such that Heisei 20 (the twentieth year of Emperor Akihito's reign, or 2008 by the Gregorian calendar) becomes "Shōwa 83".

Media

Manga

Sayonara, Zetsubou-Sensei is written and illustrated by Kōji Kumeta. It was serialized in Kodansha's Weekly Shōnen Magazine from April 27, 2005 to June 13, 2012. Kodansha collected its chapters in thirty tankōbon volumes, released from September 16, 2005 and August 17, 2012.

In North America, the manga was licensed for English release by Del Rey Manga. Eight volumes were released from February 24, 2009 to November 23, 2010. The series was license rescued by Kodansha USA in 2010. They released volume 9–14 from June 21, 2011 to April 3, 2012.

Anime

Sayonara, Zetsubou-Sensei was adapted into a 12-episode anime television series, directed by Akiyuki Shinbo and animated by Shaft. It aired in Japan on TV Kanagawa and other networks between July 7 and September 23, 2007. A special 50-minute DVD summary episode titled  was released on January 1, 2008. A second DVD summary episode was released on August 27, 2008.

A 13-episode second season, titled , was broadcast from January 5 to March 29, 2008. A 3-episode original animation DVD (OAD), titled , was released on October 17, December 10, 2008 and February 17, 2009.

A 13-episode third season, titled , was broadcast from July 4 to September 26, 2009. A 2-episode OAD, titled , was released on November 17, 2009 and February 17, 2010. A special episode was offered to people who bought all three of Japanese Blu-ray Disc Boxes of the series and was released on January 31, 2012.

In North America, Media Blasters licensed the first Sayonara, Zetsubou-Sensei anime series in February 2010 and was going to release the first English-subtitled DVD volumes in May 2010. However, the series was put on hold until March 2013, when they dropped the rights to the series. At Anime Expo 2019, it was announced that Nozomi Entertainment licensed the series for a Blu-ray release in 2020. In May 2021, Nozomi Entertainment explained that the series' release was delayed due to lack of scripts in Japan. Besides this, the company announced that they will release the entire anime franchise, including all three television anime seasons and both OVAs.

Internet radio show
An Internet radio show titled , produced by Frontier Works organized by Hirotaka Tahara and directed by Futoshi Satō, began airing on August 28, 2007 on Animate TV. The show is co-hosted by Hiroshi Kamiya and Ryōko Shintani who played Nozomu Itoshiki and Nami Hitō respectively in the anime. Each episode started with a mini drama between Nozomu and Nami then followed by corners replying mails from listeners in several theme related to the series. The show is often referred as SZBH because of the in-show call sign. As of the 180th episode, the show has received over 153,000 mails.

The show features six special broadcast. The first one was aired on November 27, 2007 titled  which acts as if Ryōko Shintani is a sole host with Hiroshi Kamiya as a guest. The fourth special broadcast titled  was aired on November 24, 2008 and featured several still image of the in-show character, Sanosuke, marathoning from Kodansha office to the recording studio. The fifth special broadcast was aired on December 31, 2008 and titled . The sixth one was aired on April 15, 2009, titled .

A special radio event titled  was held on March 18, 2008 featuring Yū Kobayashi, who plays Kaere Kimura, with Kenji Ōtsuki and Narasaki as guests. The recording of the event was released later as the third DJCD volume. A second radio event titled  was held on March 24, 2009, featuring Ai Nonaka and Takahiro Mizushima, who play Kafuka Fuura and Jun Kudō, respectively. The recording of this event was released as the ninth DJCD. A total of 21 CDs for the show have been released by King Records. Ten of the CDs contain newly recorded episodes, while the fifth and sixth CDs are the collections of the popular episodes.

Reception
Sayonara, Zetsubou-Sensei won the 31st Kodansha Manga Award for the shōnen category in 2007. As of April 2011, the manga had over 5 million copies in circulation.

Notes

References

Further reading

External links

 Manga official website 
 Anime official websites:
 First series official website 
 Second series official website 
 Third series official website 
 Series 3.5 official website 
 

2005 manga
2007 anime television series debuts
2007 Japanese television series endings
2008 anime OVAs
2008 anime television series debuts
2008 Japanese television series endings
2009 anime OVAs
2009 anime television series debuts
2009 Japanese television series endings
Absurdist fiction
2000s animated comedy television series
Anime series based on manga
Dark comedy anime and manga
Japanese comedy television series
Kodansha manga
Kōji Kumeta
Media Blasters
Satire anime and manga
Satirical books
Shaft (company)
Shōnen manga
Tokyo MX original programming
Winner of Kodansha Manga Award (Shōnen)
Teaching anime and manga